Aiho is a census town in the Habibpur CD block in the  Malda Sadar subdivision of Malda district in the Indian state of West Bengal.

Etymology
Aiho is a beautiful village sandwiched between two rivers Tangon and Mahananda. Due to its confluence with two big rivers specially Mahananda, Aiho has got a long history of its culture, trade and lifestyle. Mohona (the rejuvenated connecting point of Tangon and Mahananda) is the main port. A few hundred years ago, large boats were the main mode of communication at Aiho with other neighboring villages and trade hubs. The sailors of these large boats were mainly from Bihar. They used to call the passengers as "Rahi ho to ahio" to embark on their boats. "Rahi" means passenger,"ahio" means please come. From that, the village got the name "Rahio" which later changed to "Ahio" and lately called Aiho.

Geography

Location

Area overview
The area shown in the adjacent map covers two physiographic regions – the Barind in the east and the tal in the west. The eastern part is comparatively high (up to 40 metres above mean sea level at places) and uneven. The soils of the eastern region are “hard salty clays of a reddish hue and the ground is baked hard as iron.” It lies to the east of the Mahananda River. The area lying to the west of the Mahananda River, the tal, is a flat low land and “is strewn with innumerable marshes, bils and oxbow lakes.” The tal area is prone to flooding by local rivers. The total area is overwhelmingly rural. There are two important historical/ archaeological sites in the area – Pandua and Jagjivanpur.

Note: The map alongside presents some of the notable locations in the area. All places marked in the map are linked in the larger full screen map.

Demographics
According to the 2011 Census of India, Aiho had a total population of 5,898, of which 2,982 (51%) were males and 2,916 (49%) were females. Population in the age range 0-6 years was 605. The total number of literate persons in  Aiho was 4,181 (78.99% of the population over 6 years).

 India census, Aiho had a population of 5,407. Males constitute 50% of the population and females 50%. Aiho has an average literacy rate of 61%, higher than the national average of 59.5%; with 54% of the males and 46% of females literate. 13% of the population is under 6 years of age.

Infrastructure
According to the District Census Handbook, Maldah, 2011, Aiho covered an area of 0.73 km2. It had 4 km roads with both open and closed drains. The protected water-supply involved overhead tank, tap water from treated sources, hand pump. It had 390 domestic electric connections. Among the medical facilities it had 1 dispensary/ health centre, 1 veterinary hospital, 8 medicine shops. Among the educational facilities, it had 4 primary schools, 2 middle schools, 2 secondary schools, 2 senior secondary schools. The nearest general degree college at Malda 16 km away. Among the social, cultural and recreational facilities it had 1 working women’s hostel, 1 cinema theatre, 1 public library, 1 reading room. It produced rice, beedi. It had branch offices of 1 nationalised bank, 1 cooperative bank, 1 agricultural credit society.

Education
Aiho High School is a Bengali-medium co-educational institution established in 1900. It has facilities for teaching from class V to class XII. It has a playground, a library with 3,950 books, and  5 computers for teaching and learning purposes.

Aiho Girls High School is a Bengali-medium girls only institution established in 1932. It is a Kasturba Gandhi Balika Vidyalaya in nature. It has facilities for teaching from class V to class XII.  It has a library with 450 books, and 10 computers for teaching and learning purposes.

References

Cities and towns in Malda district